Subepidermal calcified nodule is a type of Calcinosis cutis. It's a cutaneous condition characterized by calcification of the skin resulting from the deposition of calcium and phosphorus, occurring most frequently as one or a few skin lesions on the scalp or face of children.  Lesions may also appear on the ear and eyelid.

See also 
 Ectopic calcification
 Calcinosis cutis
 Skin lesion
 List of cutaneous conditions

References 

Skin conditions resulting from errors in metabolism